California desert may refer to:

Deserts of California
High Desert (California)
Low Desert
Mojave Desert
Death Valley
Sonoran Desert
Colorado Desert